Lebedevo is a rural locality or village in Babayevsky District, Vologda Oblast, Russia. The population was 9 as of 2002.

References 

Rural localities in Babayevsky District